Doo is a 2011 Indian Tamil-language romantic comedy drama film written and directed by Sriram Padmanabhan. The film features Sanjay and Nakshatra in the lead roles, alongside Sangeetha Bhat and Urvashi. Produced by AG Entertainment, the film was released on 5 August 2011.

Cast 
 Sanjay as Vasanth
 Nakshatra as Swapna
 Sangeetha Bhat as Anu
 Urvashi as Vasanth's mother
 Rajesh as Swapna's father
 Mayilswamy
 Manobala
 Jagan as Kutty
 Lollu Sabha Jeeva as Karthik

Production 
Debutant director Sriram Padmanabhan cast Sanjay of Mundhinam Paartheney in the lead role, alongside Nakshatra, who made her acting debut in Tamil cinema. Nakshatra was the daughter of former actress Sumithra and film producer D. Rajendra Babu. Sangeetha Bhat, who ad previously appeared in Kannada television serials, also debuted in Tamil cinema through the project.

Prior to the film's release, appreciating the efforts of the director Sriram Padmanabhan, the film's producers Gunasekaran and Aadhinarayanan gifted him a ten sovereign gold chain.

Soundtrack
The film had six songs composed by music composer duo Abhishek and Lawrence. 
Kaiya Thoda Vendam — Ranjith, VJ Divya
Oru Naal Vidu Murai — Haricharan, Prashanthini
Dooda — T. Rajendar
Nadhiyilae — Silambarasan
Va Va — Reshmonu
Nadhiyilae (Fully Loaded) — Silambarasan

Release and reception 
The film had a theatrical release across Tamil Nadu on 5 August 2011. A reviewer from The New Indian Express wrote "Despite its minor flaws, Doo is a promising work from a debutant filmmaker", calling it a "well-attempted love story". A reviewer from Indiaglitz.com wrote "Sriram Padmanabhan seems to have done his home work well, for the film is more like a mirror capturing the routine of youngsters who are in love these days. The dialogues are extremely casual but very realistic". A reviewer from Sify also gave the film a mixed review, though stated "the film is an attempt at a clean entertainer by director Sriram and is to be commended in that aspect. Setting a reasonable pace, with no room for melodrama, emotional excess or over acting anywhere, the director succeeds in keeping you guessing the outcome till the end." In contrast, a reviewer from film portal Behindwoods.com wrote "Doo reminds a lot of the mega hit Kushi in most aspects. An excellent premise for the director to show his mettle but Sriram struggles to exploit this advantage to his benefit", and concluded that the film could have been better.

Sriram later moved on to work on Mappillai Vinayagar featuring Lollu Sabha Jeeva in the lead role, but the film did not eventually have a theatrical release.

References 

2010s Tamil-language films
2011 films
Indian romantic comedy films
2011 romantic comedy films